Mark Anthony Shumate (born March 30, 1960) is a former American football nose tackle in the National Football League (NFL). He played for the New York Jets and the Green Bay Packers, both in 1985. Shumate played at the collegiate level at the University of Wisconsin–Madison and was drafted by the Kansas City Chiefs in the tenth round of the 1983 NFL Draft.

See also
Green Bay Packers players

References

1960 births
Living people
American football defensive tackles
Edmonton Elks players
Green Bay Packers players
New York Jets players
People from Poynette, Wisconsin
Players of American football from Wisconsin
Wisconsin Badgers football players